Balakhninsky is an urban locality (an urban-type settlement) in Bodaybinsky District of Irkutsk Oblast, Russia. Population:

Administrative status
Balakhninsky is the capital of the Balakhninsky Urban Settlement (Балахнинское городское поселение) municipal unit, which includes the Balakhninsky urban locality, as well as the villages of Kyakhtinsky and Vasilievsky.

Geography 
The 25N-092 highway. passes through the village, connecting it with the city of Bodaibo to the north, as well as with the settlements of Artyomovskiy, Kropotkin and Perevoz. The nearest airfield is Bodaybo Airport.

References

Urban-type settlements in Irkutsk Oblast